Sangwŏn County is a county of North Hwanghae, formerly one of the four suburban counties located in east P'yŏngyang, North Korea. Prior to 1952, Sangwŏn was merely a township of Chunghwa County. In  1952 it was separated as a separate county, and in 1963 it was added as a county of Pyongyang.  It is north of North Hwanghae's Hwangju, Yŏntan, and Suan counties, south of the Nam River and Kangdong county west of Yŏnsan county, and east of Chunghwa county. In 2010, it was administratively reassigned from P'yŏngyang to North Hwanghae; foreign media attributed the change as an attempt to relieve shortages in P'yŏngyang's food distribution system.

Transportation 
Sangwon county has a single overhead bidirectional trolleybus system with a length of just over 4 kilometers running from Myongdang-rodongjagu to Sangwon Cement Complex, ending a few kilometers to the east in another residential zone. The depot is located on the eastern terminus and features a covered building. Apart from a period in 2017, the line appears to be in constant operation.

Administrative divisions
The county is divided into one town (ŭp), one worker's district (rodongjagu) and 20 'ri' (villages).

References

Counties of North Hwanghae